The 2022 South American Rhythmic Gymnastics Championships were held in Paipa, Colombia, from November 28 to December 4, 2022. The competition was organized by the Colombian Gymnastics Federation and approved by the International Gymnastics Federation.

Medalists

Senior

Junior

Medal table

Senior

Junior

Combined

Participating nations

See also
 Gymnastics at the 2022 South American Games

References 

2022 in gymnastics
Rhythmic Gymnastics,2022
International gymnastics competitions hosted by Colombia
2022 in Colombian sport
November 2022 sports events in Colombia
December 2022 sports events in Colombia